The Srinagarind Dam (also known as the Srinakarin Dam; ;) is an embankment dam on the Khwae Yai River in Si Sawat District of Kanchanaburi Province, Thailand. The purposes of the dam are river regulation and hydroelectric power generation. The dam was named after Princess Srinagarindra.

Background
Feasibility studies for the dam were carried out between May 1967 and May 1969 and designs from September 1970 to December 1977. Construction began in 1974 and it was completed in 1980. The first of the dam's generators was commissioned in 1980 and the last in 1991. The original cost of the dam was estimated to be US$45 million but because the dam was constructed on a fault line, the dam's foundation had to be reinforced which raised the cost to US$114 million.

Design
The dam's power station has an installed capacity of 720 MW and contains three  Francis turbines and two 180 MW Francis pump-turbines. The pump-turbines serve the dam's pumped-storage capability and generate electricity during peak hours. In off-peak hours, the pump turbines return water from the lower reservoir back into the upper reservoir.

See also

List of power stations in Thailand
Vajiralongkorn Dam - upstream

References

Dams completed in 1980
Energy infrastructure completed in 1980
Energy infrastructure completed in 1991
Dams in Thailand
Pumped-storage hydroelectric power stations in Thailand
Embankment dams
Buildings and structures in Kanchanaburi province
1980 establishments in Thailand